Montreal Ukrainians (Sports Association Montreal Ukrainians) is a Canadian soccer team based in Montreal. The club was founded by Ukrainians that had settled in Montreal after the Second World War.

History
The club has had a very storied history, considering it was formed by such the Ukrainian diaspora group in 20 November 1949. The team primarily played in the National Soccer League until 1964, although it spent the 1963 season in the Eastern Canada Professional Soccer League.

Year-by-year

Honours 
 Canada Soccer Football Championship
 Winners (1): 1957 Carling’s Red Cap Trophy / Challenge Trophy
 Runners up (2): 1955, 1969

Amateur Montreal League Champions: 7
1950, 1956, 1958, 1961, 1965, 1969

Amateur Quebec Championship League Champions: 7
1955, 1957, 1969, 1972, 1978, 1979, 1980

See also
 Toronto Ukrainians

References 
Notes

External links
 Українська футбольна діаспора
 Кленовый лист на вышиванке
 Canadian Soccer League

Canadian National Soccer League teams
Ukr
Ukrainian association football clubs outside Ukraine
Association football clubs established in 1949
Ukrainian diaspora in Canada
Ukrainian-Canadian culture
1949 establishments in Quebec
Diaspora sports clubs in Canada